3Z or 3-Z may refer to:

Travel Service Polska (IATA code)
American Blimp  MZ-3 or MA-3Z

See also
Z3 (disambiguation)